Marazion Town Hall is a municipal building in the Market Place, Marazion, Cornwall, England. The town hall, which is currently used as a museum, is a Grade II listed building.

History
The current structure was commissioned to replace an old market hall which dated back at least to the mid-18th century, but was substantially rebuilt in the late-18th century.

The new building was designed in the French Renaissance  style, built in rubble masonry and was completed in 1871. The design involved a symmetrical main frontage with a two-stage clock tower facing southeast onto the Market Place; there was a doorway with a wrought iron gate flanked by brackets supporting a canopy in the first stage, a blind niche with tracery surmounted by a pair of trefoils in the second stage and, above that, a mansard roof with projecting clock faces. The tower was flanked by full-height turrets surmounted by conical roofs. Internally, the principal room was the council chamber on the first floor which was accessed by way of a staircase in the right hand turret. A lock-up for petty criminals was established at the rear of the building.

On account of the relatively small population of the town, the borough council, which had met in the town hall, was abolished under the Municipal Corporations Act 1883. The building was subsequently transferred to a specially formed entity, the Marazion Town Trust, with the mayor, Thomas Lean, becoming the first chairman of the trust. The building subsequently became known as St Thomas's Hall: the ground floor of the building went on to become the local fire brigade headquarters and then, in 1933, it became a branch of Barclays Bank.

In the late 20th century, the ground floor of the building was converted for use as a local history museum. The local parish council, which became Marazion Town Council in 1974, chose to use All Saints Church Hall its meeting place, but continued to post notices of its meetings on the notice board outside the town hall.

References

Government buildings completed in 1871
City and town halls in Cornwall
Marazion
Grade II listed buildings in Cornwall